Richard Francis Daykin (7 January 1887 – 1 September 1943) was an Australian rules footballer who played for Collingwood in the Victorian Football League (VFL).

Daykin played two seasons over three years for Collingwood in the VFL. His first season was in 1908 and after missing the 1909 season he returned to play in 1910.

Daykin was the rover in Collingwood's 1910 premiership team, his last VFL game.

After the premiership win, Daykin was suspended for 12 months after confessing to his involvement in a second half melee with Carlton player Jack Baquie. Originally, based on umpire Jack Elder's testimony, it was Collingwood's Tom Baxter who was given the 12-month ban, but Daykin signed a declaration which stated that it was he, and not Baxter, that had struck Baquie. The VFL accepted the declaration and as Daykin had retired after the Grand Final win, no Collingwood player was suspended for the incident. This incident is said to be central to, or even the specific origin of, the long-standing rivalry which still exists between the clubs.

References

1887 births
Collingwood Football Club players
Collingwood Football Club Premiership players
South Bendigo Football Club players
Australian rules footballers from Victoria (Australia)
1943 deaths
One-time VFL/AFL Premiership players